Thiania pulcherrima is a species of spider of the genus Thiania. It is found from Sri Lanka, Vietnam, Malaysia, and Sulawesi.

References

Salticidae
Arthropods of Malaysia
Spiders described in 1846
Spiders of Asia